The 2001–02 Swedish Figure Skating Championships were held in Växjö from January 11 through 13, 2001. Skaters competed in the disciplines of men's and ladies' singles, with the results among the selection criteria for the 2002 Winter Olympics, the 2002 World Championships, the 2002 European Championships, and the 2002 World Junior Championships.

Senior results

Men

Ladies

External links
 results

2001 in figure skating
2002 in figure skating
Swedish Figure Skating Championships
Figure Skating Championships
Figure Skating Championships
Sports competitions in Växjö